Imam Ahmed Stadium (Amharic: ሐረር ኢማም አሕመድ ስታድየም) It is mostly used for football matches and serves as the home stadium of Harar City F.C. (formerly Harar Beer F.C.). The stadium has a capacity of 10,000 people. Dire Dawa City S.C. briefly used the stadium as its home in 2018 while renovation were taking place at their own home stadium, Dire Dawa Stadium.

See also

 Aw Abadir Stadium

References

Multi-purpose stadiums in Ethiopia
Football venues in Ethiopia
Harari Region